The recorded history of Wetherby, a market town in the City of Leeds metropolitan borough, West Yorkshire, England, began in the 12th and 13th centuries when the Knights Templar and later the Knights Hospitallers were granted land and properties in Yorkshire. The preceptory founded in 1217 was at Ribston Park. In 1240 the Knights Templar were granted by Royal Charter of Henry III the right to hold a market in Wetherby (known then as Werreby). The charter stated the market should be held on Thursdays and an annual fair was permitted lasting three days over the day of St James the Apostle.

From 1318 to 1319, the North of England suffered many raids from the Scots. After the Battle of Bannockburn Wetherby was burned and many people taken and killed. According to the blue plaque  at the entrance to Scott Lane, it could be named after the Scottish raiders in 1318, or perhaps after the 18th century drovers who used Wetherby as a watering place.

In 1233 the Archbishop of York allowed remission of sins to those who contributed to the building of the Wetherby Bridge.

Wetherby Castle

For 15 years Wetherby was home to a castle built without the consent of the King or Parliament. It was constructed in 1140 by the Percy family to guard the crossing by the River Wharfe, particularly against raids by the Scottish, which were prevalent since most of England north of Yorkshire was controlled by the Scots.  However, in 1155 its demolition was ordered by King Henry II.  Only its foundations remain, very little of which comes above ground level, in 2005 and 2006 the three dwellings occupying this site were demolished and replaced by flats, named 'Castle Keep' to reflect its history, and marked with a blue plaque commissioned by Wetherby Town Council and Wetherby Civic Society.

English Civil War
Wetherby played a small part in the Civil War in 1644. Before marching to Tadcaster and on to Marston Moor, the Parliamentarians spent two days in Wetherby while joining forces with the Scots.  Oliver Cromwell stayed in the Half Moon Inn, in Collingham before the Battle of Marston Moor.

Great Sale of Wetherby (1824)

To fund work on his house at Chatsworth, the Duke of Devonshire sold the Manor of Wetherby, with the exception of one house. It included many houses, businesses, a corn mill, and brewery.  The 1824 sale catalogue included "nearly 200 dwellings", "Two Posting Houses, Three Inns and Seven Public Houses", "The Valuable Manor of Wetherby", and "Upwards of 1300 acres".  The sale catalogue for the sale of the "Whole of the large market town of Wetherby (with the exception of one house therein)" describes Wetherby as an important stop on the high turnpike from Ferry Bridge to Glasgow.

On the first day of the sale, the Swan and Talbot sold for £1,510, on the second day The Crown, The Red Lion and The Blue Boar sold for of £2870. An example from the catalogue regarding the sale of The Crown Inn on the High Street.

Lot Number: 66
Occupiers: Widow Smith
Description: The Crown Inn, in High Street, containing on the ground floor, two parlours, dining room, a back room, bar and scullery; cellar, four bedchambers and a small room.  In the back yard in a brewhouse, store room, coal house, barn, cow house, pig cotes, a seven stall stable with granary over: another stable with a malt room over, and a box stable.  These premises extend onto the market place.

The Victorian Era

Industrialisation
In Victorian times, Wetherby was a rural town, the major town for the surrounding rural districts where the cattle market was located, Wetherby industrialised during this era, though less than in the more textile dependent areas of the West Riding.  Wetherby's brewery and mill developed, while Teesdale and Metcalf built a factory on what is now the Horsefair Centre. Wetherby provided the setting for the novel Oldbury (1869) by Annie Keary. Although Wetherby's Victorian industrial development was neither notable nor significant, the industrial revolution did not bypass it, and the town experienced growth.  The Wetherby area saw industrial expansion during the Second World War when munitions factories were built at Thorp Arch and in the 1960s at the Sandbeck Industrial Estate.

The building of the railways

In 1837, the Angel public house served two mail coaches daily. In the 1840s the Harrogate to Church Fenton railway line was built.  By the 1860s, the Wetherby News campaigned to link Wetherby to Leeds by railway.  In 1866 the NER began construction of the Cross Gates to Wetherby line, the link to Leeds. A railway station was built on Linton Road, the older railway station is now The Old Engine Shed dance hall, off York Road.  From the building of the Cross Gates-Wetherby line until its closure, raceday specials ran from Bradford Interchange to Wetherby.

Utilities
Wetherby Gasworks was opened in 1852 on what is now Gashouse Lane. It had two gasholders and closed in the late 1970s. Wetherby had a concrete water tower in the Spofforth Hill area which was demolished in 1959. The gasworks no longer has gasholders, or produces town gas since the conversion to natural gas, however a gas site still does exist in the vicinity of Gashouse Lane and Victoria Street.

Twentieth century

Around the start of the 20th century
By around the start of the 20th century, Wetherby had a mixed economy.  The town had a large mill which employed many in the town.  The trades which had kept Wetherby going in earlier decades still thrived, such as the cattle market and the towns many inns, which served travellers on the A1.  The growth of the railways in the 19th century had lessened Wetherby's strategic position on the Great North Road.  Wetherby by this time had rail links to Leeds, Harrogate and York and had its own gas works, producing town gas.

The world wars

Like many other towns in the West Riding, Wetherby suffered heavy losses in the First World War, with many Wetherby men attached to the Leeds Pals, who suffered particularly heavy losses at the Battle of the Somme.  Many Wetherby residents worked at the Barnbow munitions works in Cross Gates for the duration of the war.  A memorial to the losses suffered by Wetherby in the Great War, designed by E.F. Roslyn was erected adjacent to the towns bridge in 1922. During the Second World War Wetherby had the country's only inland landship, HMS Ceres situated on the site now occupied by Wetherby High School.  ROF Thorp Arch, what is now the Thorp Arch trading estate was also built outside the town as a munitions factory, which provided war time employment for many in the town as well as across Leeds.  Unusually, Wetherby does not have a memorial to its losses in the Second World War, one was neither erected or as in many towns, a list of the dead added to the Great War memorial.

Brewery
For many years the town was home to Wharfedale Brewery which became Oxley's mineral water factory during the inter-war years. The factory was demolished in the 1950s, with the chimney being imploded in 1959. and was redeveloped as the West Yorkshire bus depot and bus station, and has since been further redeveloped to include shops, offices, and a restaurant in addition to the bus station. The nearby watermill, which was situated by the weir, is now the site of luxury riverside flats.

The closure of the railways
Both the LNER Cross Gates to Wetherby line and the Harrogate to Church Fenton line closed in 1965 under the Beeching Axe.  Once the railway had been closed, the council deliberated over whether to convert the disused line into a central relief road, however such plans never came to fruition.  The line has since being converted into the Harland Way, cycle track, linking Wetherby with Spofforth.

Town centre redevelopment
Throughout the 1960s the town council deliberated over how best to enlarge the town centre to cope with the needs of a growing population and to provide the town with a purpose-built supermarket.  Plans were put forward to enlarge the town over the ings, or to develop the town centre into a pedestrian precinct.  There were two similar plans for this put forward, both involved the demolition of The Red Lion public house and replacing it with offices, one plan involved the pedestrianisation of the High Street and North Street and a central bypass being built linking Boston Road with York Road.  The Second scheme involved pedestrianising the Market Place, allowing buses to still use the lower end to access the bus station.

In the end it was decided to build a purpose-built shopping precinct, which was built in the 1970s and underwent a significant redevelopment throughout 2003.  By 2006 the remaining open parts of the Horsefair Centre were enclosed under a glass canopy roof.

Bypassing Wetherby
The town's bypass was originally constructed between 1957 and 1959. This started South of the town by the A58 and finished in Kirk Deighton.  For many years, the town's bypass started from at a roundabout near a Forte Posthouse hotel, which was prone to lengthy queues at busy periods. The roundabout still remains, but the A1 was diverted in July 1988 at a cost of £11.5 million. On 18 December 2004, the northern section of the bypass was substantially diverted to a new section of the A1(M), bypassing Kirk Deighton, after construction work had begun in August 2003. The upgrade of the section between Bramham and Wetherby started in July 2007 and was scheduled to be completed in 2009. The upgrading of the A1 includes a new motorway service station at the Wetherby North Junction (near Kirk Deighton).  This will include another large hotel, the only one in Wetherby, North of the River Wharfe.

Industrialisation
Although the 20th century saw the loss of Wetherby's mill and brewery, it also saw the development of the Sandbeck Industrial Estate and the nearby Thorp Arch Trading Estate.  The Trading Estate was built mainly as munitions factories at the beginning of the Second World War.  The Thorpe Arch trading estate brought employers such as Farnell (electronic components), Safepack (Packaging), Goldenfry (gravy and savoury food products), Swift Research (Market Research) and the Forensic Science Laboratory.  The Forensic Science Laboratory closed in 2012, and demolition of the site began in May 2015.

Twenty First Century

Bypassing Wetherby again
Wetherby was to be once again bypassed in the early 2000s.  The original bypass became somewhat of a bottleneck on the A1.  The bypass was upgraded in two stages, the first being Wetherby to Dishforth.  This involved moving the road to the East away from the town, the closing of the York Road and Deighton Road Junctions, and the opening of a new junction on a new link road.  Wetherby Service Station was opened in 2008, with a hotel expected to open in 2009.  The Aberford to Wetherby stretch was upgraded later; this is yet to be completed.  A further link road has been built between Boston Road and Wattlesyke, and another link road is to be built between Boston Road and Sandbeck Approach.

Redeveloping the Horsefair Centre
After the 1990s, when Morrisons acquired the Horsefair Centre, it became apparent the supermarket was too small and the centre lacked parking.  Throughout the 1990s and 2000s, the car park was extended over the former Burgess Factory (formerly Appleyard Farm Services) on Hallfield Lane and the playing fields of Wetherby High School.  In 2003, the existing Supermarket was demolished.  Eleven months later in 2004, a new flagship Morrisons was opened to anchor the centre.  This required the relocation of the Post Office, which was moved to a temporary unit on the Crossley Street Car Park, before moving to a new home on the Market Place, opposite its original home.  While the supermarket was closed, free buses ran from Spofforth Hill to Morrisons in Starbeck and from Deighton Road to Morrisons in Boroughbridge.  Later in July 2005, work began to enclose the Western wing of the precinct, which had previously been mostly open.  The roof was completed in 2006.

Blue plaques
Wetherby Town Council has for some years commissioned blue plaques to mark points of notable history. These have been erected at the site of the former castle, the former watermill, the town hall, the Angel public house, the former cattle market, the Red Lion public house, The Shambles, and St James' Church, as well as other landmarks. The town has no museum of its own, but its history is well documented at Leeds Central Library.

See also
History of Leeds
History of Hunslet
History of Kirkstall
History of Seacroft

References

Further reading
 Wetherby The History of a Yorkshire Market Town, Robert Unwin
 Wetherby (The Archive Photographic Series)

History of West Yorkshire
History of Leeds
Wetherby, history of
Wetherby